The Hardwick House is a historic house at 59–61 Spear Street in Quincy, Massachusetts. The -story wood-frame house was built in 1850s, and is one of the city's largest Greek Revival houses. Its massing, with side-gable roof, is more typical of the Federal period, but it has corner pilasters, a full entablature, and pedimented gables. The main entry has full-length side lights and is topped by an entablature. The house was built by Franklin Hardwick, owner of a local granite business.

The house was listed on the National Register of Historic Places in 1989.

See also
 National Register of Historic Places listings in Quincy, Massachusetts

References

Houses completed in 1850
Houses in Quincy, Massachusetts
National Register of Historic Places in Quincy, Massachusetts
Houses on the National Register of Historic Places in Norfolk County, Massachusetts
Greek Revival architecture in Massachusetts